The England cricket team visited Ireland on 8 May 2015 for a single One Day International (ODI). In February 2015, the England and Wales Cricket Board (ECB) confirmed that the current England ODI captain, Eoin Morgan, was allowed to miss the match due to prior commitments with the Indian Premier League. On 28 April, James Taylor would take Morgan's place for the first time. England initially named 11 players in their squad for the match, but called up Adil Rashid and Mark Wood from the Test squad after they missed out on selection for the 3rd Test against the West Indies.

The match was abandoned with no result after 18 overs of the Ireland innings.

Squads
On 4 May, Ireland bowler Tim Murtagh was ruled out of the match after tearing a hamstring in Middlesex's County Championship match against Durham.

ODI series

Only ODI

References

2015 in Irish cricket
2015
Ire
International cricket competitions in 2015